Beery is a surname. Notable people with the surname include:

 Adaline Hohf Beery (1859–1929), American author, newspaper editor, songbook compiler, hymnwriter
 Dan Beery (born 1975), American competition rower, Olympic champion and world champion
 Janet Beery, American mathematician and historian of mathematics
 Noah Beery (1882–1946), American actor
 Noah Beery Jr. (1913–1994), American actor
 Wallace Beery (1885–1949), American actor